Bonivur's Heart is a 1969 Soviet four-part historical-revolutionary film about the establishment of Soviet power in the Russian Far East and Primorsky Krai directed by .

Plot
Vladivostok in 1922. The underground workers escaped the arrested counterintelligence comrades. Among the organizers is the Komsomol member Vitaly Bonivur, for whose head a large reward is appointed.

Bonivur himself for surname Antonov, settles in the railway depot and agitates the workers to sabotage military supplies. In the workshops are almost ready cars of the Japanese armored train. Bonivour, with the help of repairmen, sets fire to the compound, placing explosives under the fuel tank.

After a successful action, the urban underground goes into the taiga to the partisans. Under the guise of the villagers, young people from the Toporkov detachment are making a daring raid on the neighboring village where the whites stand. In sight of a drunken guard, they kidnapped the officer along with the paramedic, and took them to the base.

The commander of the guerrillas receives an order to join up with other detachments, in order to consolidate the forces on the eve of the offensive of the People’s Revolutionary Army. A small group of defenders remained on the spot. Taking this opportunity, the Cossack hundred, at the denunciation of the escaped paramedic, moved to the location of the partisan detachment and, after an unequal battle, captured the village.

The local residents who helped the partisans and the delegates of the congress of the poor held at the same time were subjected to execution. White tied up Bonivur and a captive with a weapon in the hands of an elderly communist and took them along. The cavalry sent in pursuit did not manage to help out the comrades. After cruel torture, the prisoners were executed by the retreating Cossacks.

Cast
 Lev Prygunov as  
 Boris Chirkov as Storozhenkov
 Ivan Pereverzev as Zhilin, an old peasant
 Viktor Korshunov as Boris Lyubansky
 Pyotr Glebov as  captain Karayev
 Maya Bulgakova as Glafira Nasedkina
 Vladimir Yemelyanov as Bagrov
 Yuri Lavrov as Mikhail Diterikhs

Release 
In February 1971 a two-part film version was released on the screen with a timing of 157 minutes.

References

External links
 
  Роман   на сайте Либрусек
Russian Civil War films
Films set in 1922
Soviet television miniseries
1960s Soviet television series
1960s television miniseries
Films based on Russian novels
Dovzhenko Film Studios films